is a stony near-Earth object of the Aten group on a highly-eccentric orbit. It was discovered by astronomers of the Lincoln Near-Earth Asteroid Research at the Lincoln Laboratory's Experimental Test Site near Socorro, New Mexico, on 14 September 1998.

Its minor-planet moon, provisionally designated , was discovered in September 2003. It has an orbital period of 14.53 hours and measures approximately 48% of its primary, or 380 meters. It is one of seven known Aten binaries as of 2017.

Interaction with Earth 

's orbit is very eccentric, with an aphelion beyond the orbit of Mars and a perihelion inside the orbit of Mercury. It has an orbital period of 360.29 days (0.99 years) and makes close approaches to Earth. But  makes closer approaches to other inner planets, especially Mars. Its closest approach to a planet between 1950–2200 was to Mars, as it passed  from Mars on 18 March 1964, and will pass  from Mars on 12 October 2065.

Moon 

 has one moon, . This moon was discovered from lightcurve observations going from 13 to 28 September 2013, and was confirmed by radar observations from the Arecibo Observatory one year later.

For comparison, the Sun appears to be 0.5° from Earth. The secondary orbits its primary in a manner very similar to the adjunct image, where the red cross is the center of mass.

Numbering and naming 

This minor planet was numbered by the Minor Planet Center on 10 September 2003. As of 2018, it has not been named.

Notes

References

External links 
 Binary and Ternary Near-Earth Asteroids Detected by Radar, Lance Benner, JPL
 Asteroids with Satellites, Robert Johnston, johnstonsarchive.net
 Asteroid Lightcurve Database (LCDB), query form (info )
 Asteroids and comets rotation curves, CdR – Observatoire de Genève, Raoul Behrend
 
 
 

066063
066063
066063
066063
066063
066063
066063
066063
19980914